Deutschland erwacht is a 1933 German Nazi propaganda film.

Cast

External links 

1933 documentary films
1933 films
Films of Nazi Germany
1930s German-language films
German black-and-white films
German documentary films
Black-and-white documentary films
Documentary films about Adolf Hitler
Paul von Hindenburg
1930s German films